Hooked Up may refer to:

 Hooked Up (film), a 2013 Spanish horror film
 Hooked Up (TV series), a 2004 reality television series